Prostomatea is a class of ciliates. It includes the genera Coleps and Pelagothrix.

References

Further reading

Intramacronucleata
Ciliate classes